WW1 is the debut album by indie rock band White Whale.

Track listing

Personnel
White Whale
Matt Suggs - Vocals, Guitar
Zach Holland - Guitar, Lap Steel, Elec Mandolin, Keyboard
Dustin Than Kinsey - Piano, Guitar, Synth
Rob Pope - Bass, Moog
John Anderson - Drums, Percussion

Additional personnel
Ed Rose - Producer, Engineer, Mixing
Chris Cosgrove - Engineer
Maggie Fost - Design
Tabitha Morris - Paintings

References

2006 debut albums
White Whale (band) albums
Merge Records albums
Albums produced by Ed Rose